Richard Fielder (April 13, 1925 –  July 22, 2020) was an American television writer.

Career
Richard Fielder had a career spanning from the 1950s to the 1990s, during which he wrote for over 59 television shows and film projects. He worked as a writer for The Waltons, Gunsmoke, Seven Brides for Seven Brothers,. He also wrote the mini-series North and South and George Washington.

His papers are located within the American Heritage Center at the university of Wyoming.

References

External links
 

1925 births
2020 deaths
American male screenwriters
American people of Irish descent
20th-century American male writers
20th-century American screenwriters